The Popular Front for the Liberation of the Occupied Arabian Gulf (abbreviated PFLOAG), later renamed the Popular Front for the Liberation of Oman and the Arabian Gulf, was a Marxist and Arab nationalist revolutionary organisation active in an armed struggle against the Arab monarchies in the Arabian Peninsula. The organization was dedicated to overthrow all monarchies in Arabia culminating in the Dhofar Rebellion against the Sultanate of Oman.

The PFLOAG was organized in 1968 as the successor to the Dhofar Liberation Front. The program adopted was strongly tinged with communism. Its aim was to establish a "democratic people's republic" and to expel the British army from Oman. The Front sought to establish a constitution, abolish martial law, restore freedom of the press and expression and ensure the rights of minorities. On economic issues, it intends to nationalize the oil companies, develop industries and implement land reform. The Front calls for more social justice and affirms its support for all Asian, African and Latin American liberation movements. References are also made to the Palestinian struggle. The rebels open schools to which both boys and girls have access (girls' education was forbidden in Oman until 1970). Tribalism was fought against and social relations tended to evolve, with a specific place given to women, including in the armed struggle.

Having close relations to the government of South Yemen, the PFLOAG opened an office there. With South Yemeni support, PFLOAG guerrillas were able to seize control over large sections of western Dhofar. In August 1969 PFLOAG captured the town of Rakhyut.

The PFLO leadership pledged to continue on the “trail of struggle”, as Al-Ghassani put it in an address on June 9, 1978, that marked the thirteenth anniversary of the revolution:
We are committing ourselves to fight alongside our Omani people in the Gulf and the Arabian Peninsula against the ambitions of imperialism and Iranian expansion

In 1974 the organization was divided into two separate bodies: the Popular Front for the Liberation of Oman and the Popular Front for the Liberation of Bahrain.

Notes

References

Arab nationalism in Bahrain
Arab nationalism in Oman
Arab nationalism in Yemen
Arab nationalist militant groups
Arab Nationalist Movement
Communism in Bahrain
Communism in Oman
Communism in Yemen
Dhofar Rebellion
National liberation movements
Popular fronts
South Yemen
Paramilitary organizations based in Oman